Syed Zahoor Shah Hashmi  a.k.a. Syed Hashmi  (b. 21 April 1926; d. 4 March 1978) was an academic, a poet writer and a philosopher. He is considered an important figure in Balochi literature. He wrote in Balochi, Urdu, Persian, and Arabic. Syed Hashmi was awarded Pride of Performance.

References

External links
 Remembring Syed Zahoor Shah Hashmi 
 Transitions
 Balochi dictionary

Urdu-language poets from Pakistan
Persian-language poets
Islamic philosophers
People from Balochistan, Pakistan
Pakistani people of Arab descent
20th-century Pakistani philosophers
1926 births
1978 deaths
Pakistan Movement
Muslim poets